County Tipperary is a county in Ireland. It is in the province of Munster and the Southern Region. The county is named after the town of Tipperary, and was established in the early 13th century, shortly after the Norman invasion of Ireland. It is Ireland's largest inland county and shares a border with eight counties, more than any other. The population of the county was 159,553 at the 2016 census. The largest towns are Clonmel, Nenagh and Thurles.

Tipperary County Council is the local authority for the county. In 1838, County Tipperary was divided into two ridings, North and South. From 1899 until 2014, they had their own county councils. They were unified under the Local Government Reform Act 2014, which came into effect following the 2014 local elections on 3 June 2014.

Geography
Tipperary is the sixth-largest of the 32 counties by area and the 12th largest by population. It is the third-largest of Munster's six counties by both size and population. It is also the largest landlocked county in Ireland. 

Tipperary is bounded (clockwise) by Offaly, Laois, Kilkenny, Waterford, Cork, Limerick, Clare and Galway. Its eight neighbours are the most of any county on the island.

The region is part of the central plain of Ireland, but the diverse terrain contains several mountain ranges: the Knockmealdown, the Galtee, the Arra Hills and the Silvermine Mountains. Most of the county is drained by the River Suir; the north-western part by tributaries of the River Shannon; the eastern part by the River Nore; the south-western corner by the Munster Blackwater. No part of the county touches the coast. The centre is known as 'the Golden Vale', a rich pastoral stretch of land in the Suir basin which extends into counties Limerick and Cork. At 917 m, Galtymore is the highest point.

The Devil's Bit is a part of the Slieve Bloom range. The River Shannon flows along the northwest border with Limerick, Galway and Clare. The River Suir rises at the Devil's Bit and flows into the sea at Waterford.

Baronies
There are 12 historic baronies in County Tipperary: Clanwilliam, Eliogarty, Iffa and Offa East, Iffa and Offa West, Ikerrin, Kilnamanagh Lower, Kilnamanagh Upper, Middle Third, Ormond Lower, Ormond Upper, Owney and Arra and Slievardagh.

Civil parishes and townlands

Parishes were delineated after the Down Survey as an intermediate subdivision, with multiple townlands per parish and multiple parishes per barony. The civil parishes had some use in local taxation and were included on the nineteenth century maps of the Ordnance Survey of Ireland. For poor law purposes, district electoral divisions replaced the civil parishes in the mid-nineteenth century. There are 199 civil parishes in the county. Townlands are the smallest officially defined geographical divisions in Ireland; there are 3,159 townlands in the county.

Largest towns

History

Following the Norman invasion of Ireland, the Kingdom of Munster was claimed as a lordship. By 1210, the sheriffdom of Munster shired into the shires of Tipperary and Limerick. In 1328, Tipperary was granted to the Earls of Ormond as a county palatine or liberty. The grant excluded church lands such as the archiepiscopal see of Cashel, which formed the separate county of Cross Tipperary. Though the Earls gained jurisdiction over the church lands in 1662, "Tipperary and Cross Tipperary" were not definitively united until the County Palatine of Tipperary Act 1715, when the 2nd Duke of Ormond was attainted for supporting the Jacobite rising of 1715.

The county was divided once again in 1838. The county town of Clonmel, where the grand jury held its twice-yearly assizes, is at the southern limit of the county, and roads leading north were poor, making the journey inconvenient for jurors resident there. A petition to move the county town to a more central location was opposed by the MP for Clonmel, so instead the county was split into two "ridings"; the grand jury of the South Riding continued to meet in Clonmel, while that of the North Riding met in Nenagh. When the Local Government (Ireland) Act 1898 established county councils to replace the grand jury for civil functions, the ridings became separate "administrative counties" with separate county councils. Their names were changed from "Tipperary North/South Riding" to "North/South Tipperary" by the Local Government Act 2001, which redesignated all "administrative counties" as simply "counties". The Local Government Reform Act 2014 has amalgamated the two counties and restored a single county of Tipperary.

Local government and politics
Following the 2014 local election, Tipperary County Council is the local authority for the county. The authority is the successor council to North Tipperary County Council and South Tipperary County Council which operated up until June 2014. The local authority is responsible for certain local services such as sanitation, planning and development, libraries, the collection of motor taxation, local roads and social housing.

Most of the county is in the Dáil constituency of Tipperary, which returns five deputies (TDs) to the Dáil. A small part of the county in the former rural district of Nenagh is in the constituency of Limerick City. The county is part of the South constituency for European elections.

Culture 

Tipperary is referred to as the "Premier County", a description attributed to Thomas Davis, Editor of The Nation newspaper in the 1840s as a tribute to the nationalistic feeling in Tipperary and said that "where Tipperary leads, Ireland follows". 
Tipperary was the subject of the famous song "It's a Long Way to Tipperary" written by Jack Judge, whose grandparents came from the county. It was popular with regiments of the British Army during World War I.
The song "Slievenamon", which is traditionally associated with the county, was written by Charles Kickham from Mullinahone, and is commonly sung at sporting fixtures involving the county.

Irish language 
There is no Gaeltacht in County Tipperary and consequently few Irish speakers. Nevertheless, there are five Gaelscoileanna (Irish language primary schools) and two Gaelcholáistí (Irish language secondary schools).

Economy 
The area around Clonmel is the economic hub of the county, due to manufacturing facilities owned by Bulmers (brewers) and Merck & Co. (pharmaceuticals) east of the town. There is much fertile land, especially in the region known as the Golden Vale, one of the richest agricultural areas in Ireland.

Tipperary is famous for its horse breeding industry and is the home of Coolmore Stud, the largest thoroughbred breeding operation in the world.

Tourism plays a significant role in County Tipperary – Lough Derg, Thurles, Rock of Cashel, Ormonde Castle, Ahenny High Crosses, Cahir Castle, Bru Boru Heritage Centre and Tipperary Crystal are some of the primary tourist destinations in the county.

Transport 
Road transport dominates in County Tipperary. The M7 motorway crosses the north of the county through Roscrea and Nenagh and the M8 motorway bisects the county from north of Two-Mile Borris to the County Limerick border. Both routes are among some of the busiest roads on the island. The Limerick to Waterford N24 crosses the southern half of Tipperary, travelling through Tipperary Town, Bansha, north of Cahir and around Clonmel and Carrick-on-Suir.

Railways
Tipperary also has a number of railway stations situated on the Dublin–Cork line, Dublin-to-Limerick and Limerick–Waterford line. The railway lines connect places in Tipperary with Cork, Dublin Heuston, Waterford, Limerick, Mallow and Galway.

Sports 
County Tipperary has a strong association with the Gaelic Athletic Association which was founded in Thurles in 1884. The Gaelic Games of Hurling, Gaelic football, Camogie and Handball are organised by the Tipperary GAA County Board of the GAA. The organisation competes in the All-Ireland Senior Hurling Championship and the All-Ireland Senior Football Championship. Tipperary, with 28 wins, are the only county to have won an All-Ireland title in every decade since the 1880s.

Horse racing takes place at Tipperary Racecourse, Thurles Racecourse and Clonmel Racecourse.

Places of interest

Ardfinnan Castle
Athassel Priory
Cahir Castle
Coolmore Stud
Devil's Bit – a mountain near Templemore
Dromineer
Galtymore – a munro, and the highest mountain in County Tipperary (919m).
Glen of Aherlow
Glengarra Wood
Holy Cross Abbey
Kilcash Castle
Lorrha
Lough Derg
Monaincha
Mount St. Joseph Abbey, Roscrea
Mitchelstown Cave
Ormonde Castle, Carrick-on-Suir
Redwood Castle (Castle Egan)
Rock of Cashel
Roscrea Castle
Semple Stadium
Slievenamon – mountain associated with many Irish legends (721m)
Timoney Standing Stones

Notable people

Anne Anderson, ambassador to the United States
John Desmond Bernal, controversial twentieth-century scientist
Dan Breen, Irish Republican during the Irish War of Independence, later a TD for the county.
William Butler, nineteenth-century army officer, writer, and adventurer
Peter Campbell, founder of the Uruguayan navy
The Clancy Brothers, folk music group
Paddy Clancy, singer, harmonicist
Tom Clancy, singer, actor
Bobby Clancy, singer, banjoist
Liam Clancy, singer, guitarist
Kerry Condon, actress
Noel Coonan
Frank Corcoran, composer
Dayl Cronin, singer, member of boyband Hometown
John N. Dempsey, Governor of Connecticut (1961–1971)
Dennis Dewane, American politician
John M. Feehan, author and publisher
Frank Fitzgerald, American politician
Lumsden Hare, stage and film actor
Séamus Healy
Tom Hayes
Mary Hanafin
Una Healy, singer, member of the girl group The Saturdays
Máire Hoctor
Patrick Hobbins, American politician
Alan Kelly, politician
Tom Kiely, Olympic gold medalist
Shane Long, footballer
Denis Lynch, showjumper
Thomas MacDonagh, Irish Republican and Signatory of the 1916 Proclamation
Shane MacGowan, musician, songwriter, member of the Pogues
Marty Maher, athletic instructor for 50 years at West Point, subject of the film The Long Gray Line
Martin Mansergh
John Morrissey, New York gang-leader, boxer and US congressman
Niall O'Dowd, publisher, Irish Central
Fergus O'Dowd
Tomás Ó hÍcí, Irish scribe
Martin O'Meara, recipient of the Victoria Cross
Frank Patterson, tenor
Ramsay Weston Phipps, military historian
Rozanna Purcell, model, winner of Miss Universe Ireland 2010
Lena Rice, Wimbledon tennis champion
Adi Roche, campaigner for peace, humanitarian aid and education, founder and chief executive of Chernobyl Children International
Donal Ryan, writer
Richard Lalor Sheil, politician, writer, and orator
Pat Shortt, actor, comedian, and entertainer
Laurence Sterne, author and clergyman, most famous for Tristram Shandy
Seán Treacy, Irish Republican during the Irish War of Independence
Declan Kelly, CEO of Teneo
 Tony Ryan, founder and chairman GPA and Ryanair philanthropist

See also
 Annals of Inisfallen 
 High Sheriff of Tipperary
 List of civil parishes of County Tipperary
 List of abbeys and priories in the Republic of Ireland (County Tipperary)
 List of National Monuments in County Tipperary
 Lord Lieutenant of Tipperary
 Tipperary Hill, a neighbourhood in Syracuse, New York, United States, inhabited by many descendants of County Tipperary.
 Vehicle registration plates of the Republic of Ireland

References

Bibliography

External links

Tipperary Institute
County Tipperary Historical Society
A website dedicated to the genealogical records of the county. It offers fragments of the 1766 census, the complete Down Survey, as well as a ream of other useful information
 Rebellion of 1641 in County Tipperary by Jim Condon
 Score for 'Quality of Life' in County Tipperary
Gaelscoil stats
Tipperary Studies
IrelandGenWeb Project

 

 
Tipperary
Tipperary